Anereuthina is a genus of moths in the family Erebidae.

Description
Palpi upturned and met by a sharp frontal tuft, where the second joint reaching vertex of head and roughly scaled, and long and obliquely porrect (extending forward) third joint. Antennae usually minutely ciliated. Thorax and abdomen smoothly scaled. The fore tibia fringed with long hair in male. Mid tibia spined. Forewings with somewhat rounded apex.

Species
Anereuthina atriplaga (Walker, 1869)
Anereuthina renosa Hübner, 1823

Former species
Anereuthina lilach (Guenée, 1852)

References

 
Cocytiini
Noctuoidea genera